Cardinal of Guise can refer to these members of the French ducal family de Guise who became cardinals:
Louis I, Cardinal of Guise (1527-1578), Bishop of Troyes
Louis II, Cardinal of Guise, (1555-1588), nephew of Louis I
Louis III, Cardinal of Guise, (1575–1621), the third son of Henry I, Duke of Guise, and Catherine of Cleves

See also
Cardinal of Lorraine (disambiguation)